Icon is a compilation album by British rock band Queen, released on 11 June 2013 by Hollywood Records. The album was only released in the United States and Canada as a limited edition release.

Track listing

Charts

Weekly charts

Year-end charts

References

2013 compilation albums
Queen (band) compilation albums
Hollywood Records compilation albums